Wodzianka, wodzionka, kapłonek or brotzupa is a Silesian and Central Poland bread soup made from stale bread, fat and water or milk. Traditionally, wodzionka is prepared by soaking two- to three-day-old stale bread in water or broth and adding garlic, bay leaves, black pepper and other seasonings, fried bacon, and lard or butter. It was reportedly served in late autumn and winter, when cows had less milk.

See also
 Acquacotta
 Bread soup
 List of bread dishes
 List of soups

References

Polish cuisine
Silesian cuisine
Bread soups
Łódź Voivodeship